Marta Magaly Quiñones Perez (born 1945) is a Puerto Rican poet.

Quiñones was born in Ponce, Puerto Rico in 1945. She began working as a librarian at the University of Puerto Rico in 1973 and earned a Masters of Comparative Literature from the university in 1981.

She has written poetry, short stories, essays, criticisms and reviews, including at least 14 published volumes. She published her first collection of poems, in 1969. Her 1985 poetry collection, was honored with a Puerto Rican PEN Club award and a prize from publisher Ediciones Mairena. Her poetry often explores the complicated nature of Caribbean identity.

Works
 Entre mi voz y el tiempo (1969)
 Era que el mundo era (1974)
 Zambayllu (1976)
 Cosas de poetas (1978)
 Cantándole a la noche misma (1978)
 En la pequeña antilla (1982)
 Nombrar (1985)
 Razón de lucha, razón de amor (1989)
 Sueños de papel (1996)
 Patio de fondo (2004)
 Mi mundo: palabra de niños (2004)
 Poemas para los pequeños (2006)
 Quiero una noche azul (2007)
 Poemas de pasión y libertad (2009)

References

External links
 

1945 births
Living people
Poets from Ponce
Puerto Rican women poets
University of Puerto Rico alumni
University of Puerto Rico faculty
Hispanic and Latino American librarians